Kiryat Mal'akhi – Yoav railway station is a railway station in southern Israel, next to Kfar Menahem and Highway 6. It is named after the closest city, Kiryat Mal'akhi, and the adjoining Yoav Regional Council. It opened in late 2018.

The station was envisioned as part of the renovation works for the railway to Beersheba, but a budget had not been allocated, so only the station's platforms were originally built.

In 2016, a tender was published for the construction of the station.

References

Railway stations in Southern District (Israel)